The 1991 Limerick Senior Hurling Championship was the 97th staging of the Limerick Senior Hurling Championship since its establishment by the Limerick County Board in 1887.

Patrickswell were the defending champions, however, they were defeated by Ballybrown at the quarter-final stage.

On 6 October 1991, Ballybrown won the championship after a 1-11 to 1-10 defeat of Kilmallock in the final. It was their second championship title overall and their second title in two championship seasons.

Results

Final

References

Limerick Senior Hurling Championship
Limerick Senior Hurling Championship